Dwight T. Parker Public Library is a public library in Fennimore, Wisconsin. The building was constructed in 1923 to house the city's library, which had previously been based in a Methodist church and the Old Fennimore House. Dwight T. Parker, a local banker, funded the library. The architectural firm Claude & Starck designed the structure in a mixture of the Mediterranean Revival and neoclassical styles; the brick building features terra cotta ornamentation and a tile roof.

The library was added to the National Register of Historic Places on March 10, 1983.

References

Library buildings completed in 1923
Libraries on the National Register of Historic Places in Wisconsin
Buildings and structures in Grant County, Wisconsin
Mediterranean Revival architecture in Wisconsin
Neoclassical architecture in Wisconsin
National Register of Historic Places in Grant County, Wisconsin
1923 establishments in Wisconsin